The Saudi Arabian national emblem was adopted in 1950. According to the Saudi Basic Law, it consists of two crossed swords with a palm tree in the space above and between the blades. 

The two swords represent the Kingdom of Hejaz and the Sultanate of Nejd and its dependencies, which were united under Ibn Saud in 1926, or strength, stamina, and sacrifice.

The crest represents that prosperity can only be had through Justice.

The palm stands for growth, vitality, and prosperity and the crossed swords represent Justice. The palm tree represents the Kingdom's assets which are defined as its people, heritage, history, and resources natural and non-natural. Thus, the palm is shown to be guarded by the two swords, which represent the forces to be used in defence of the nation.

Historical emblems

Usage

The Emblem appears on government documents, diplomatic missions, as well as several Saudi Arabian flags. It is emblazoned in gold on the flag of the Armed Forces of Saudi Arabia (which is also the Kingdom's war ensign), and on the lower hoist of the Royal Standard. The latter is essentially the national flag with the added Emblem in gold, which is placed in the lower part of the (left-facing) hoist and not in the canton as with other royal standards. The Emblem's lower position is in deference to the sacred nature of the Shahada, the Islamic creed.

References

National symbols of Saudi Arabia
Saudi Arabia
Saudi Arabia
Saudi Arabia